Jane Lauder Warsh (born 1973) is an American billionaire heiress and businesswoman.

Early life 
Lauder is the daughter of Jo Carole Lauder (née Knopf) and Ronald Lauder. Her father served as United States Ambassador to Austria under President Ronald Reagan and also was president of the World Jewish Congress. She is the granddaughter of Estée Lauder and Joseph Lauder, the co-founders of the cosmetics company Estée Lauder Companies. She has one sister, Aerin Lauder Zinterhofer.

Lauder graduated from the Chapin School and Stanford University.

Career 
Lauder joined the family business in 1996. In 2013, she was promoted to global president and general manager of Estée Lauder’s Origins, Darphin, and Ojon brands. She currently runs the company's Clinique unit, a skincare line frequently sold in malls.

Lauder owns 20 million shares in the Estée Lauder Companies making her worth $4.2 billion in 2019.

In 2018, Lauder joined the board of Eventbrite.

Personal life 
She is married to Kevin Warsh, whom she met at Stanford, and who is a former governor of the U.S. Federal Reserve System. The couple lives in Manhattan.

See also 
 Estée Lauder Companies
 Lauder family

References

1973 births
American billionaires
American corporate directors
American cosmetics businesspeople
American people of Austrian-Jewish descent
American people of Czech-Jewish descent
American people of Hungarian-Jewish descent
American people of Slovak-Jewish descent
Businesspeople from New York City
Lauder family
Living people
Chapin School (Manhattan) alumni